Simplemente Lo Mejor is a greatest hits album by Guatemalan singer-songwriter Ricardo Arjona that was released on December 2, 2008. The album is composed of Arjona's number-one hits, drawn from Animal Nocturno (1993) to Galería Caribe (2000). It served as his final project under the Sony Music label after signing a contract with Warner Music in 2008. A CD+DVD and a DVD edition of the album were released in several countries; these included a collection of music videos for the compilation's songs.

Simplemente Lo Mejor was made available one month after the release of Arjona's eleventh studio album, 5to Piso (2008). This led to speculation that the labels were in a fight to win Arjona's fanbase and sales. Simplemente Lo Mejor reached number seven on the Mexican Albums Chart, the US Billboard Latin Pop Albums chart and number 33 on the Billboard Top Latin Albums chart. It was awarded platinum certifications in Argentina and Mexico.

Background and release

Background 
After spending the majority of his career signed to Sony and Sony BMG, Arjona signed a long-term recording deal with Warner Music Latina in September 2008. Iñigo Zabala, chairman of Warner Music Latin America commented that "he's an artist that fits perfectly with our company"; he also stated "We are a label that has a major catalog of songwriters and quality pop and rock from the likes of Maná, Alejandro Sanz, Laura Pausini, and now, Arjona." Arjona announced his eleventh studio album, 5to Piso, on 18 November 2008. In the first month of retail sales, approximately 200,000 copies were purchased; it went Platinum in Mexico, the United States and several other countries. It debuted at number one on Top Latin Albums, becoming his second chart-topper on that list, and sold more than one million copies worldwide. The album received a Grammy Award nomination for Best Latin Pop Album and a Latin Grammy Award nomination for Best Singer-Songwriter Album.

Release 
While Warner Music released Arjona's new studio album, Sony Music released Simplemente Lo Mejor. This led to speculation that the labels were in a fight to win his fanbase and sales. 5to Piso hit shelves on 18 November 2008 in the United States, and Simplemente Lo Mejor followed on 2 December 2008. A CD+DVD edition and a DVD edition of the album were released that same day in the United States and Spain. At that time, Univisión named Simplemente Lo Mejor "a true collector's item that every fan of Arjona or just happy to his poetry should not be without."

Reception 

Simplemente Lo Mejor entered the Top 100 Mexico at number 35 the week of its debut. The following week, the album jumped to number 17 and, on its third week of release, reached its peak of number seven. It spent three weeks inside the top ten and 27 weeks on the chart. On the US Billboard Top Latin Albums chart, the album attained a peak of number 33 and stayed on the chart for 70 weeks. It performed better on the Latin Pop Albums component chart, where it reached a peak of number seven, remaining on the chart for 88 weeks. Simplemente Lo Mejor was awarded a platinum certification in Argentina and Mexico for 40,000 copies sold and shipped, respectively. Simplemente Lo Mejor received positive critical reception; Jason Birchmeier from AllMusic awarded the compilation four-and-a-half stars out of five and stated that the compilation is "nothing short of stellar, filled with major hits and showcasing perfectly Arjona's mid-'90s rise to fame."

Track listing 
Following, the track list of Simplemente Lo Mejor as is shown on the iTunes Store.

Personnel
Credits are taken from AllMusic.

Ricardo Arjona – composer, direction, primary artist, producer, realization
Carlos Cabral Jr. – arranger
Carlos Greene – artist direction
Waldo Madera – arranger
Angel "Cucco" Peña – arranger, producer

Chart performance

Charts

Sales and certifications

Release history

References

External links 
 Official website of Ricardo Arjona

2008 greatest hits albums
Ricardo Arjona compilation albums
Sony BMG Norte compilation albums
Spanish-language compilation albums